Supernatural was a Swedish pop group that consisted of the winners of the second season of the Swedish reality TV show Popstars. In Sweden the show was broadcast on Kanal5 in 2003.
The band had several hits with songs like Supernatural and Rock U. Supernatural was expected to take part in the Swedish precursor selections for the Eurovision Song Contest in 2003 but its record label did not publicize the band sufficiently and the members subsequently split up in 2004 after arguments with their record label.

Members
Mathilda Carmbrant
Linda Eriksson (aka Linda Varg)
Sandra Leto
Robert Skowronski
Sebastian Zelle

After split-up
The members of Supernatural started a new band, this time with the name Caught Up, but it did not experience the same success.

Discography

Albums

Singles

References

Popstars winners
Swedish pop music groups